Alexander Scott Rae (born 30 September 1969) is a Scottish professional football manager and former player who played as a midfielder.

Rae began his youth career at Rangers and started his senior career at Falkirk. Rae played for Millwall, Sunderland, Wolverhampton Wanderers, Rangers, Dundee, Milton Keynes Dons. Back from rehab clinic for alcoholism in 1998, he was with Sunderland and played regularly in the top flight until September 2001. He then joined Wolverhampton Wanderers, and quickly became the key player in the team, winning the fans' player of the season award. In 2003, he helped the team back into the Premier League, and had his best seasonal tally with 8 goals. He then went back to Scotland, joining Rangers where he had started his youth career, in May 2004, and won the league title in his first season.

Rae was appointed player-manager of Dundee in May 2006. He led the club to third place in the First Division in his first season and took them a place higher in his second. He stopped his career as a footballer during the 2008–09 season and went to Sweden as part of his work towards a UEFA Pro Licence.

Playing career
Rae was born in Glasgow. He started his career as a youngster at boyhood heroes Rangers but was rejected by boss Graeme Souness. He dropped down to junior leagues with Bishopbriggs before he joined Falkirk and enjoyed a successful two years before heading south to sign for Millwall in 1990 for £100,000. He made his Millwall debut on 25 August 1990 and played for the club for six years. He is currently Millwall's joint-ninth all-time leading scorer, with 71 goals in all competitions. His form for Millwall earned him a big money move to Premier League Sunderland for £1 million in 1996, where he established himself as a crowd-pleasing, combative midfielder. His career took a downturn though, as he descended into alcoholism, leading to him attending a rehab clinic during 1998. He stayed sober after this treatment and further rehabilitation, and later became a patron for the Sporting Chance clinic.

Back on the field, he won promotion as champions back to the Premier League with Sunderland in 1998–99 and played regularly in the top flight. By 2001, he had dropped out of manager Peter Reid's plans and was sold to Wolverhampton Wanderers in September 2001, for £1.2 million. He quickly became an important player for Wolves, winning the fans' player of the season award in his first campaign. The following year, he helped them back into the Premier League when they won the play-offs in 2003. He had a strong year in the top flight, finishing as the club's leading scorer with eight goals – his best-ever seasonal tally – but could not prevent the club's relegation. Rae re-signed for Rangers in May 2004, and won the league title in his first season, scoring once in the process against Dunfermline. He only featured 12 times in his second season, however, and was later released by the club.

Coaching and managerial career

Rae was appointed player-manager of Dundee on 24 May 2006. He led the club to third place in the First Division in his first season and took them a place higher in his second. He gave up playing for the 2008–09 season but was sacked on 20 October 2008 with the team in eighth place in the league. Following this, Rae travelled to Sweden as part of his work towards a UEFA Pro Licence.

In July 2009 he joined MK Dons, on a temporary basis with a view to a permanent deal, as first team coach working under his former Wolves teammate Paul Ince.

In 2010, Rae made a return to competitive football to cover for injuries. On 29 October 2010, Rae joined Notts County as assistant manager until he left the club following the departure of manager Paul Ince on 3 April 2011.

In February 2013, Rae joined Blackpool, once again with Paul Ince. The season finished with Blackpool in 15th place.

On 21 January 2014, along with Paul Ince, Rae's Blackpool contract was terminated and he left the club. In August 2014 he became assistant manager at Belgian club KRC Genk, working with Alex McLeish.

Rae was appointed manager of Scottish Championship side St Mirren in December 2015, after former manager Ian Murray resigned. After an unsuccessful start to the 2016–17 season, Rae and his assistant David Farrell were sacked by the club.

Rae became assistant to Paul Ince at Reading in February 2022.

Managerial statistics

Honours
Sunderland
Football League First Division: 1998–99

Wolverhampton Wanderers
Football League First Division play-offs: 2003

Rangers
Scottish Premier League: 2004–05
Scottish League Cup: 2004–05

Scotland U21
 UEFA under-21 Euros: Bronze 1992
 Toulon Tournament: Bronze 1991

Individual
 PFA Team of the Year: 1995–96 First Division

References

External links

1969 births
Living people
Footballers from Glasgow
Scottish footballers
Scotland under-21 international footballers
Association football midfielders
Falkirk F.C. players
Millwall F.C. players
Sunderland A.F.C. players
Wolverhampton Wanderers F.C. players
Rangers F.C. players
Dundee F.C. players
Milton Keynes Dons F.C. players
Scottish Premier League players
Scottish Football League players
English Football League players
Premier League players
Scottish football managers
Dundee F.C. managers
St Mirren F.C. managers
Scottish Football League managers
Scottish Professional Football League managers
Notts County F.C. non-playing staff
Blackpool F.C. non-playing staff